Wayne Black and Kevin Ullyett were the defending champions but lost in the second round to Xavier Malisse and André Sá.

Mark Knowles and Daniel Nestor won in the final 5–7, 6–4, 7–6(7–3) against Mahesh Bhupathi and Max Mirnyi.

Seeds
All eight seeded teams received byes into the second round.

Draw

Finals

Top half

Bottom half

External links
 2003 Stella Artois Championships Doubles draw

Doubles